Tanyth Berkeley (born 1969) is an artist and photographer based in Brooklyn, NY.

Berkeley was born in Hollywood, CA.  She is best known for her portraits.  Her subjects have included transgender women, buskers, people with albinism, and people she met on the subway in New York City.  Her work has been exhibited at the Museum of Modern Art's "New Photography" exhibition in 2007 as well as at the Denver Museum of Contemporary Art and two solo exhibitions at Bellwether Gallery, New York.

Berkeley received a Master of Fine Arts degree from Columbia University in 2004.

Selected exhibitions

2009

Grace, Danziger Project, New York

2007

New Photography, Museum of Modern Art, New York

The Muse, The Fugitive & The Frequency, Bellwether, New York

L’Autre, Rosenwald-Wolf Gallery, Philadelphia

2005

Beyond the Portrait, Piazza Oberdan, Milan

Greater New York, MOMA/PS1 Contemporary Art Center, New York

White Out, Denver Museum of Contemporary Art, Denver

2004

Flicker, Socrates Sculpture Garden, Long Island City

2002

A Special Place, Arena Gallery, Brooklyn

2001

Young Guns II, Art Director's Club, New York

References

External links
Documentary about Tanyth Berkeley PEOPLE * LOVE * PHOTOS by amadelio film, release date: August, 2009
Interview with Who Walk In Brooklyn Photographer Tanyth Berkeley Is Looking At YOU, June 24, 2009
Interview with The Morning News
Images, texts and biography from the Saatchi Gallery
Further information from Bellwether Gallery
Tanyth Berkeley on ArtFacts.net

American portrait painters
Living people
1969 births
Columbia University School of the Arts alumni
People from Hollywood, Los Angeles
Artists from Brooklyn